Marko Vukčević (born Podgorica, 8 November 1979) is a Montenegrin rock singer. His 2012 album, "Tears of Glass", was his first to be advertised with road billboards in Montenegro. Others who worked on the album included Saša Vasić, Sergej Ćetković, Slaven Knezović, and Bojan Jovović.

Discography
 Zauvijek ("Always") 2000
 as part of group Evropa for the Eurovision Song Contest 2004
 Ne zaslužuješ me, single, 2008
 album Suza od stakla ("Tears of Glass"), 2012

References 

1979 births
Living people
21st-century Montenegrin male singers
Musicians from Podgorica